Pal Anders Szalkai (born 17 April 1970 in Bårslöv, Helsingborg Municipality, Skåne) is a long-distance runner from Sweden. He represented his native country at the 1996 Summer Olympics in the men's marathon, finishing in 64th place. Szalkai won the 2001 edition of the Stockholm Marathon.

Achievements

References

1970 births
Living people
Swedish male long-distance runners
Swedish male marathon runners
Athletes (track and field) at the 1996 Summer Olympics
Olympic athletes of Sweden
People from Helsingborg Municipality
Sportspeople from Skåne County